The Associated Students of the University of California, Santa Barbara (ASUCSB) is the undergraduate students' union of the University of California, Santa Barbara. It is one of two students' unions at UCSB, the other being the Graduate Student Association. It purports to be both a non-profit organization and an official department of UCSB. It is classified as an "unincorporated association" by the California Attorney General's Registry of Charitable Trusts. Its goals are to "voice student concerns and express student opinion" and "enrich student life and give students services and opportunities not offered by the [university] administration." ASUCSB derives its authority from section 61.10-15 of the "Policies Applying to Campus Activities, Organizations and Students" of the University of California.

Structure
Like other student governments in the United States, the governing structure of the organization is modeled on the United States government, with executive, legislative, and judicial branches. The operations and policies of the organization are dictated by a set of by-laws called the Associated Students Legal Code.

Notable projects
ASUCSB has traditionally been associated with KCSB-FM, a well known radio station that it funds. KCSB is known for being the starting point of the careers of Jim Rome, Sean Hannity, and Jeffrey Peterson.

Through its Boards, Committees, and Commissions, it has funded and operated campus services such as emergency loans, bike path improvements, and coastal redevelopment. It also co-manages the Events Center, the Recreation Center, and the University Center with the UCSB Chancellor's Office.

The AS Program Board runs events including films, concerts, lectures, and cultural events. Its end of the year music festival is Extravaganza.

2022-2023 Executives and Senators 
The current executive officers are:

 President Gurleen Pabla 
 Internal Vice President Hailey Stankiewicz
 External Vice President for Statewide Affairs Billy Wu 
 External Vice President for Local Affairs Marvia Cunanan 
 Student Advocate General Kristen Wu

The current sitting senators are:

 Off-Campus Senators (12):
 Jeffrey Adler
 Yael Berukhim
 Granger Cruz-Brenneman
 Alexa Grines
 Sohum Kalia
 Jessica Klein
 Adam Majcher
 Zachary Orsinelli
 Avery Walters
 Vacant
 Vacant
 Vacant
 On-Campus Senators (5):
 Ehsan Various
 Eddie Zong
 Vacant
 Vacant
 Vacant
 University-Owned Housing Senator (1):
 Nathan Lee
 College of Letters and Science Senator (4):
 Ava Gurwitz
 Faith Johnson
 Mina Matta
 Tessa Veksler
 College of Engineering Senator (1):
 Vacant
 College of Creative Studies Senator (1):
 Kellen Beckett
 Transfer Senator (1):
 Jay Schmidt
 International Senators (2):
 MinJun Zha
 Vacant

See also 
 Associated Students of the University of California
 Student governments in the United States
 University of California Student Association

References

External links
Associated Students Website
ASUCSB's "profile" at Charity Navigator

University of California, Santa Barbara
Student organizations in California
Student governments in the United States
Non-profit organizations based in California
California State University auxiliary organizations